Jack Coco (born October 9, 1998) is an American football long snapper for the Green Bay Packers of the National Football League (NFL). He played college football at Georgia Tech.

Early life and high school
Coco grew up in Johns Creek, Georgia and attended Johns Creek High School.

College career
Coco joined the Georgia Tech Yellow Jackets as a walk-on and redshirted his true freshman season. He was a reserve offensive lineman as a redshirt freshman and sophomore in addition to serving Georgia Tech's long snapper for the field goal unit. Coco was moved tight end going into his redshirt junior season and lost 30 pounds in the process. He continued to long snap on field goal attempts and also caught four passes for 22 yards in 2020. Coco was awarded a scholarship entering his final season at Georgia Tech. He played solely at tight end as a redshirt senior and had one reception for four yards.

Professional career

Coco signed with the Green Bay Packers as an undrafted free agent on May 17, 2022, after participating in a rookie minicamp on a tryout basis. He won the Packers' long snapper job over incumbent Steven Wirtel after Wirtel was released on August 10, 2022.

References

External links
Green Bay Packers bio
Georgia Tech Yellow Jackets bio

1998 births
Living people
American football long snappers
Georgia Tech Yellow Jackets football players
Green Bay Packers players
Players of American football from Georgia (U.S. state)